Harald Strøm (14 October 1897 – 25 December 1977) was a Norwegian speed skater, world champion, European champion and world record holder on 5000 metres. He was also a football player, national champion with his club, and playing for the national football team.

Speed skating
He set his first speed skating world record on 5000m in 1921 (8:27.7), being the first to break the magic 8:30. He improved his own record in 1922 (8:26.5). His record lasted for seven years, until Ivar Ballangrud overtook the record with 8:24.2 in 1929.

Strøm won a gold medal at the 1922 World Allround Speed Skating Championships for Men, winning both the 5000m and 10000m, and he received a silver medal in 1923. He received a gold medal at the 1923 European Allround Championships, where he also won the 5000m distance.

He was flag bearer for Norway at the 1924 Winter Olympics in Chamonix. He finished 5th on the three longest distances, and 4th allround. He represented Horten SK.

Records

World records
Over the course of his career, Strøm skated two world records:

Source: SpeedSkatingStats.com

Personal records

Source: Sports-reference.com& SpeedSkatingNews.info

Medals
An overview of medals won by Strøm at important championships he participated in, listing the years in which he won each:

Source: SpeedSkatingStats.com & Skoyteforbundet.no

Football

Strøm played for the football club Ørn Horten, and became two times Norwegian champion, in 1920 and in 1927. Strøm also played in the Cup final in 1916 and 1926, which Ørn lost. He played sixteen matches for the Norwegian national team between 1918 and 1927.

Awards
Harald Strøm was awarded Egebergs Ærespris in 1921.

References

External links

1897 births
1977 deaths
Norwegian male speed skaters
Olympic speed skaters of Norway
Speed skaters at the 1924 Winter Olympics
Norwegian footballers
Norway international footballers
FK Ørn-Horten players
World record setters in speed skating
World Allround Speed Skating Championships medalists
Association footballers not categorized by position
People from Horten
Sportspeople from Vestfold og Telemark